Ilex arisanensis is a species of plant in the family Aquifoliaceae. It is endemic to Taiwan.  It is threatened by habitat loss.

References

arisanensis
Endemic flora of Taiwan
Endangered flora of Asia
Taxonomy articles created by Polbot